Jae-suk  is a  Korean male given name.

People with this name include:
Han Jae-suk (born 1973), South Korean actor
Lee Jae-Suk (born 1963), Korean former wrestler
Oh Jae-Suk (born 1990), South Korean football player 
Yoo Jae-suk (born 1972), South Korean comedian and host

See also
List of Korean given names

Korean masculine given names